Monika Chakma (Chakma: 𑄟𑄧𑄚𑄨𑄇 𑄌𑄋𑄴𑄟𑄳𑄦 ; Bengali: মনিকা চাকমা) (born 15 September 2003) is a Bangladesh Women's National Football Team midfielder. She is nicknamed Magical Chakma. She plays forBasundhara Kings Women in Bangladesh Women's Football League In 2019, she scored a goal against Mongolia in the Bangamata U-19 Women's International Tournament. FIFA recognizes her goal as a 'magical goal'.

Early life

Monika was born on September 15, 2003, in Brahmachari, Khagrachari district. She is the youngest among five daughters  Bindu Kumar Chakma and Robi Mala Chakma. Her elder sister is Anika Chakma.

Career

Monika appeared in the first Bangamata Sheikh Fazilatunnesa Mujib football tournament played at Marchingi Government Primary School in Laxmichhari in 2010. In Chittagong in 2012, Rangamati Maghachari gave her the opportunity to be admitted to Rangamati Maghhari Government Primary School. She was runner-up at the national level after playing the Bangamata Football Tournament for the school in 2013.

International 
In the national level, she appeared in the first game to be called in the Under-14 team. The team won the Fair Play trophy for third place in the 2012 AFC Tournament in Sri Lanka where she scored three goals. HSC passed from Humanities Department of Monica Ghagra College after reading at Rangamati Ghagra High School.
Monika played in the Asian Under-14 Championship in Thailand and for Bangladesh against Mongolia at the semi-finals of the Under-19 International Gold Cup. Bangladesh got a place in FIFA's' Fans' favorite 'content. Because of this goal, FIFA awarded her the title of 'Magical Chakma'.

She joined the police force in January 2018 while continuing her education in computer in a polytechnic institute.

International goals

See also
2017 SAFF U-15 Women's Championship
2018 SAFF U-15 Women's Championship

References

2003 births
Living people
Bangladeshi women's footballers
Bangladesh women's international footballers
Bashundhara Kings players
Bangladesh Women's Football League players
Chakma people
Bangladeshi Buddhists
Women's association football midfielders
People from Khagrachhari District
Bangladeshi women's futsal players